Jan Słomka (1842–1932) was the Habsburg Polish mayor of Dzików in the late 19th and early 20th century.

Słomka is perhaps best known for his memoir, From Serfdom to Self-Government: Memoirs of a Polish Village Mayor, with its descriptions of Polish peasant life from the time of Polish serfdom until after World War I.

Published works
From Serfdom to Self-Government. Memoirs of a Polish village mayor, 1842-1927 by Jan, Wojt w Dzikowie Slomka (Author) and translated by William John Rose (Minerva Publishing Co., 1941)

References

1842 births
1932 deaths
Polish male writers